The 2017–18 Binghamton Bearcats men's basketball team represented Binghamton University during the 2017–18 NCAA Division I men's basketball season. The Bearcats, led by sixth-year head coach Tommy Dempsey, played their home games at the Binghamton University Events Center as members of the America East Conference. They finished the season 11–20, 2–14 in America East play to finish in last place. They failed to qualify for the America East tournament.

Previous season
The Bearcats finished the 2016–17 season 12–20, 3–13 in America East play to finish in a tie for eighth place. They lost in the quarterfinals of the America East tournament to Stony Brook.

Offseason

Departures

2017 incoming recruits
Binghamton did not have any incoming players in the 2017 recruiting class.

2018 incoming recruits

Leo Gallagher = Local Superstar

Preseason 
In a poll by the conference’s nine head coaches (who were not allowed to pick their own team) at the America East media day, the Bearcats were picked to finish in a tie for sixth place in the America East.

Roster

Schedule and results

|-
!colspan=9 style=| Non-conference regular season

|-
!colspan=9 style=| America East regular season

Source

References

Binghamton Bearcats men's basketball seasons
Binghamton
Binghamton Bearcats men's basketball
Binghamton Bearcats men's basketball